Zelkova schneideriana, the Chinese zelkova (a name it shares with other members of its genus), is a species of flowering plant in the family Ulmaceae. It is found in southeastern Tibet, and central and southern China, usually alongside streams. Although highly resistant to honey fungus, it can still (rarely) be afflicted with Dutch elm disease.

Uses
Its timber is high quality and resistant to decay. Fiber can be extracted from the bark and used to make paper and rope. It is used as a street tree in Wuhan, China. When planted in urban settings in North Carolina, individuals showed signs of distress including crown dieback and cracking bark.

References

schneideriana
Trees of China
Endemic flora of China
Flora of Tibet
Flora of North-Central China
Flora of South-Central China
Flora of Southeast China
Plants described in 1929